C. K. Asha (born 20 May 1976) is an Indian politician and a member of the Communist Party of India. She is a member of the Kerala Legislative Assembly, representing the Vaikom constituency. She is the former Vice President of All India Students Federation District Committee Kottayam. She was also two-time Vice-chairperson of St. Xavier's College, Kothavara.

Early life
Asha is the daughter of K. Chellappan and V. B. Bhasurangi. She was born at Vaikom on 20 May 1976. She held positions of Vice President, A.I.S.F. Kottayam District Committee; State Committee Member, A.I.S.F.; Vice Chairperson, College Union, St. Xavier's College, Kothavara (two times); Member, Mahilasangam Mandalam Committee; C.P.I. Branch Executive Member.

Political career
C. K. Asha was elected as a member of the Kerala Legislative Assembly, from Vaikom constituency. She was one among the 11% of women in the LDF government of 2016.

In 2021, Asha won the Vaikom constituency by defeating P. R. Sona of the Indian National Congress with a margin of 29122 votes.

References

External links
KERALA LEGISLATURE - MEMBERS- 14th KERALA LEGISLATIVE ASSEMBLY

Communist Party of India politicians from Kerala
Kerala politicians
1976 births
Living people
Female politicians of the Communist Party of India